NEFLIN, the Northeast Florida Library Information Network, is one of five non-profit library cooperatives committed to serving libraries throughout Florida.   

Established in 1992, NEFLIN's membership employs 2,500 staff at 560 public, academic, school, and specialized libraries located within its 24 county service area.

NEFLIN is governed by a nine-member, elected, Board of Directors that represents each type of library in the cooperative.

Through grant funding and membership dues, NEFLIN provides members access to training and continuing education, resource sharing, research and development, partnerships for grant funding, leadership opportunities, and additional services through relationships with other organizations.

Florida's multitype library cooperatives
NEFLIN is one of five multitype library cooperatives in Florida.  The other four are:
 Panhandle Library Access Network
Southeast Florida Library Information Network
 Southwest Florida Library Network
 Tampa Bay Library Consortium

References

External links
 NEFLIN website
 Official NEFLIN blog

Library consortia in Florida